Dr. Joseph Katema (20 November 1961) is a Zambian politician serving as the Minister of Chiefs and Traditional Affairs since January 2015. He previously served as Minister of Information and Broadcasting Services.

References

1961 births
Living people
Patriotic Front (Zambia) politicians
Members of the National Assembly of Zambia